Hamilton South was a burgh constituency represented in the House of Commons in the Parliament of the United Kingdom.  Formed in 1997 from the Hamilton constituency, it was abolished in 2005 and parts of the constituency went to make the constituencies of Lanark and Hamilton East and Rutherglen and Hamilton West.

Boundaries
The Hamilton District electoral divisions of Blantyre and Burnbank, Hamilton South, and Hamilton West.

Members of Parliament

Election results

Elections of the 2000s

Elections of the 1990s

Mungall used the description "Hamilton Accies Home, Watson Away", referring to demands by some fans that Hamilton Academical should play their home matches locally and that Watson, the chairman, should go.  He was a member of the Socialist Labour Party.

References 

Historic parliamentary constituencies in Scotland (Westminster)
Constituencies of the Parliament of the United Kingdom established in 1997
Constituencies of the Parliament of the United Kingdom disestablished in 2005
Politics of South Lanarkshire
Hamilton, South Lanarkshire
Blantyre, South Lanarkshire